Philip Gengembre Hubert, Sr., AIA, (August 20, 1830 – November 15, 1911) was a French-American architect and founder of the New York City architectural firm Hubert & Pirsson (later Hubert, Pirsson, and Company, active from c. 1870 to 1888, and Hubert, Pirsson, and Haddick, active from 1888 to 1898) with  James W. Pirsson (1833–1888). The firm produced many of the city's "Gilded Age" finest buildings, including hotels, churches and residences.

Life
Hubert was born in Paris to Colomb Gengembre, an architect and engineer who taught him architecture. His sister was artist Sophie Gengembre Anderson. Hubert emigrated with his parents in 1849 to the United States, first settling in Cincinnati, Ohio. In Cincinnati, he taught French by writing his own textbooks, "which were published and widely used in schools of that time." In 1853, he took up a position at Girard College in Philadelphia as the first professor of French and history; he moved to Boston and was offered a professorship at Harvard, which he did not accept. He moved to New York in 1865 and took up architecture. "As a young man, he contributed a large number of short and serial stories to magazines—of a versatile turn of mind he took a vivid interest in many things and conversed with keen intelligence and originality upon politics, social science, invention and literature…."

He moved to New York in 1865 at the end of the American Civil War and became associated with Pirsson to design six single-family residences on the southwest corner of Lexington Avenue and East 43rd Street. Upon Pirsson's death, the firm operated under the name Hubert, Pirsson & Haddick until 1893 when Hubert retired to California. In retirement, he "took a number of patents upon devices for making housekeeping easy, among which he improved oil and gas furnaces, a fireless cooker, and, during the last six months of his life, he was busy with a device for supplying hot water more quickly and more cheaply…."

Noted works
His most notable works while at Hubert & Pirsson included:
 The $5 million 12-story Central Park or Navarro Buildings (1882) on Seventh Avenue at 58th and 59th Streets
The Hawthorne, ten-story co-op

The Rembrandt, ten-story co-op
The Milano, seven-story co-op
The Chelsea (1883), twelve-story residential hotel
The Mount Morris, nine-story co-op
No. 80 Madison Avenue, nine-story co-op
No. 125 Madison Avenue, twelve-story co-op
The Sevilla (Hotel), 58th Street
The Old Lyceum Theatre at Fourth Avenue and 23rd Street
The old Shoreham Hotel, Washington, DC

See also
 Philip H. Frohman, grandson and architect
 Hubert, Pirsson & Co.
 James W. Pirsson

Notes

References

Further reading
 Tippins, Sherill,  Charles Fourier : Key to the Mystery of the Chelsea Hotel ? The website of the Association of Fourier Studies and the Records of Charles Fourier (charlesfourier.fr). December 2009. (English version)

1830 births
1911 deaths
19th-century American architects
Architects from Paris
French emigrants to the United States
American ecclesiastical architects
American residential architects